The 2016 African Archery Championships was the 11th edition of the African Archery Championships. The event was held in Windhoek, the capital city of Namibia from 28 January to 31 January 2016.

The men's and women's individual recurve tournaments also served as continental qualifying tournaments for the 2016 Summer Olympics. 3 individual qualifying spots for each gender were available.

Medal summary

Recurve

Compound

Medal table

Results

Men's Individual Recurve

Qualification round
Key
 Round of 32 
 Round of 64

Men's Individual Compound

Qualification round
Key
 Quarterfinals 
 Round of 16

Women's Individual Recurve

Qualification round
Key
 Round of 32 
 Round of 64

Women's Individual Compound

Qualification round
Key
 Quarterfinals 
 Round of 16

Men's Team Recurve

Qualification round
Key
 Quarterfinals 
 Round of 16

Women's Team Recurve

Qualification round
Key
 Semifinals

Mixed Team Recurve

Qualification round
Key
 Quarterfinals

References

Sources

Citations

African Archery Championships
2016 in Namibian sport
International sports competitions hosted by Namibia